Casearia wynadensis is a species of flowering plant in the family Salicaceae. It is native to Kerala and Tamil Nadu in India.

References

wynadensis
Flora of Kerala
Flora of Tamil Nadu
Vulnerable plants
Taxonomy articles created by Polbot